Regina Gale Ziegler is an American biochemist and nutritional epidemiologist who researched dietary, nutritional, anthropometric, and hormonal determinants of cancer risk. She was a senior investigator in the National Cancer Institute's epidemiology and biostatistics program.

Life 
Ziegler received a B.A. from Swarthmore College. She completed a Ph.D. in biochemistry from the University of California, Berkeley. Her 1971 dissertation was titled, Affinity labelling lysozyme with a carbene. She earned a M.P.H. from Harvard T.H. Chan School of Public Health. After graduate school, she taught international nutrition and global food resources courses at Yale University, Harvard University, and Tufts University. 

Ziegler joined the National Cancer Institute (NCI) in 1979, was tenured in 1987, and has served most recently as a senior investigator in the epidemiology and biostatistics program. Ziegler’s research has focused broadly on dietary, nutritional, anthropometric, and hormonal determinants of cancer risk. Her early work helped characterize the role of vegetables and fruits, individual carotenoids, folate and one-carbon metabolism in cancer etiology. In addition, she has conducted a number of breast cancer studies with emphasis on anthropometry, diet and endogenous hormones and growth factors. She helped design and direct a large, population-based case-control study of breast cancer in Asian-American women to elucidate the modifiable exposures, related to lifestyle and/or environment, that explained the 6-fold difference in breast cancer incidence between Asia and the West. Ziegler collaboratively developed an international pooled analysis of circulating vitamin D concentrations in relation to risk of colorectal and breast cancer.

Ziegler applied her training in chemistry and biochemistry to the development of new and improved methods for measuring various hormones and nutrients in epidemiologic studies. She played a critical role in the successful development of a sensitive assay for assessment of estrogen metabolites and a validated assay for concurrent measurement of the major steroid hormones. Ziegler is a fellow of the American Society for Nutrition and helped establish its nutritional epidemiology research interest section.

References 

Living people
Year of birth missing (living people)
Place of birth missing (living people)
Swarthmore College alumni
University of California, Berkeley alumni
Harvard School of Public Health alumni
National Institutes of Health people
Yale University faculty
Harvard University faculty
Tufts University faculty
Cancer epidemiologists
20th-century American women scientists
21st-century American women scientists
20th-century American biochemists
21st-century American biochemists
American women epidemiologists
American epidemiologists
American women biochemists
Fellows of the American Society for Nutrition